Letter to the Lord is the debut studio album by a France-based, Cameroonian singer-songwriter Irma. It was released in February 2011 through My Major Company, and was certified Platinum in France a year later.

Track listing

Charts and certifications

Weekly charts

Certifications

References

2011 debut albums
Irma (singer) albums